Kurdistan Democratic Party may refer to a number of Kurdish political parties:

Iraq 
 Kurdistan Democratic Party (Iraq) (KDP), an Iraqi Kurdish political party led by Massoud Barzani, previously involved in two armed insurgencies for Kurdish Independence in Iraq
 Kurdistan Democratic Party – Progressive Front, a defunct political party in Iraq

Iran 
 Kurdistan Democratic Party (Iran) (KDP-IRAN), an Iranian Kurdish political party
 Kurdistan Democratic Party of Iran (KDP-I), a Kurdish political party with its armed wing being involved in the Iranian Revolution and an armed insurgency against the Islamic Regime in Iran

Turkey 
 Kurdistan Democratic Party/North (PDK/Bakur), a Kurdish militant group involved in an armed insurgency for Kurdish independence in Turkey

Syria 
 Kurdistan Democratic Party of Syria (KDP-S), a banned Kurdish political party in Syria

Armenia 
 Kurdistan Democratic Party of Armenia, a Kurdish political party in Armenia

Kurdish organisations